Evgeniya Petrovna Kuznetsova (born 18 December 1980 in Leningrad) is a former Olympic gymnast who competed for Russia in the 1996 Olympic Games. She  won the silver medal in the team competition. She also competed for Bulgaria in the 2004 Olympic Games after switching allegiance due to differences with the Russian Federation.

Competitive history

Competitor for  Bulgaria

Competitor for  Russia

See also 

 List of Olympic female gymnasts for Russia

References

External links
List of competitive results at Gymn Forum

1980 births
Living people
Russian female artistic gymnasts
Bulgarian female artistic gymnasts
Gymnasts at the 1996 Summer Olympics
Gymnasts at the 2004 Summer Olympics
Olympic gymnasts of Russia
Olympic gymnasts of Bulgaria
Olympic silver medalists for Russia
Gymnasts from Saint Petersburg
Medalists at the World Artistic Gymnastics Championships
Olympic medalists in gymnastics
Medalists at the 1996 Summer Olympics
European champions in gymnastics
Naturalised citizens of Bulgaria